Supplices may refer to two separate ancient Greek plays:

The Suppliants, by Euripides
The Suppliants, by Aeschylus

Ancient Greek plays